A Member of the National Assembly (MNA) is a member of the National Assembly of Quebec, Canada.

In other jurisdictions within Canada, the titles used are:

 "Member of Provincial Parliament" (MPP) in Ontario,
 "Member of the House of Assembly" (MHA) in Newfoundland and Labrador, and 
 "Member of the Legislative Assembly" (MLA) in all other provinces and territories.

Parliamentary titles